Alia Malek (born December 29, 1974) is an American journalist and lawyer.

Early life and career
Malek was born in Baltimore, Maryland, in 1974. Her parents had immigrated to the United States from Syria. Malek graduated from Johns Hopkins University in 1996. She then earned a J.D. degree at Georgetown University Law Center. She worked as a civil rights lawyer at the United States Department of Justice Civil Rights Division and later went back to school to obtain a master's degree in journalism from Columbia University. She published her first book in 2009, A Country Called Amreeka. From 2011 to 2013, she lived in Damascus, Syria. Her memoir The Home That Was Our Country is based on this period. She also worked as a senior writer for Al Jazeera America. Her stories have appeared in publications such as The New Yorker, The New York Times and The Nation.

Awards
2016 – Hiett Prize

Works
A Country Called Amreeka: Arab Roots, American Stories New York: Free Press, 2009. , 
 (editor) Patriot Acts: Narratives of Post-9/11 Injustice San Francisco, Calif. McSweeneys Books 2011. , 
The Home That Was Our Country: A Memoir of Syria New York, NY: Nation Books, 2017. ,

References

External links

American civil rights lawyers
American women lawyers
American women journalists
American people of Syrian descent
1974 births
Living people
Johns Hopkins University alumni
Georgetown University Law Center alumni
Lawyers from Baltimore
21st-century American women